Lakshmi Narain College of Technology (LNCT) is an AICTE approved educational institution in the Indian state of Madhya Pradesh.

See also
Lakshmi Narain College of Technology, Jabalpur

External links
 LNCT Official website
 LNCTS official Website

References

Universities and colleges in Madhya Pradesh
Education in Indore